Gordon Lionel Gibson (March 7, 1913 – February 17, 1998) was a Canadian politician. He served in the Legislative Assembly of British Columbia from 1957 to 1960  from the electoral district of Delta, a member of the Social Credit Party.

References

1913 births
1998 deaths
British Columbia Social Credit Party MLAs